The 2022 FIS Ski Flying World Championships were the 27th Ski Flying World Championships, held from 10 to 13 March 2022 in Vikersund, Norway. It is the fifth competition of its rank to be held at this location (previously in 1977, 1990, 2000 and 2012).

The defending champion in the individual competition was German Karl Geiger and in the team competition the Norwegian national team.

On 1 March 2022, following the 2022 Russian invasion of Ukraine, FIS decided to exclude athletes from Russia and Belarus from FIS competitions, with an immediate effect.

Only seven national teams competed in the team competition – this is the smallest number in the history of the championship.

Schedule

Test results

Hill tests
On 9 March 2022, first and second test was held.

Official training results
The training held on 10 March 2022 at 13:15.

Medal summary

Medal table

Medalists

References

 
FIS Ski Flying World Championships
2022 in ski jumping
2022 in Norwegian sport
Skiing competitions in Norway
International sports competitions hosted by Norway
March 2022 sports events in Norway